Mexborough Athletic F.C. was an English association football club based in Mexborough, Doncaster, South Yorkshire.

History
The club was formed as Mexborough Town in 1903, and was the second team to take the Mexborough name, the first having been wound up three years earlier.

They spent their first season in the Sheffield Association League, winning the league title at the first attempt. The club joined the Midland League in 1905 and would remain in the competition for the rest of their existence.

The Midland League was suspended for the duration of the First World War, but Mexborough rejoined the competition when hostilities ended. The club won its only Midland League title in 1926, two years after changing their name to Mexborough Athletic. The following year they reached the First Round of the FA Cup, losing to Chesterfield at Saltergate.

Athletic would struggle on in the lower echelons of the Midland League until 1936, when after finishing bottom of the table, they resigned from the competition and disbanded.

League and cup history
{| class="wikitable collapsible" style="text-align:center;font-size:75%"
|-
!colspan="4"|Mexborough League and Cup historySportsman Rovers WildStat|-
! Season !!  Division !! Position !! FA Cup
|-
| 1903–04 || Sheffield Association League || 1st/14 || 3rd Qualifying Round
|-
| 1904–05 || Wharncliffe Charity Cup League ||  || 5th Qualifying Round
|-
| 1905–06 || Midland League || 5th/18 || 2nd Qualifying Round
|-
| 1906–07 || Midland League || 6th/20 || -
|-
| 1907–08 || Midland League || 17th/20 || 1st Qualifying Round
|-
| 1908–09 || Midland League || 12th/20 || 4th Qualifying Round
|-
| 1909–10 || Midland League || 20th/22 || 5th Qualifying Round
|-
| 1910–11 || Midland League || 10th/20 || 2nd Qualifying Round
|-
| 1911–12 || Midland League || 9th/19 || 3rd Qualifying Round
|-
| 1912–13 || Midland League || 19th/20 || Preliminary Round
|-
| 1913–14 || Midland League || 17th/18 || Preliminary Round
|-
| 1914–15 || Midland League || 17th/20 || 1st Qualifying Round
|-
|
|-
| 1919–20 || Midland League || 5th/18 || 2nd Qualifying Round
|-
| 1920–21 || Midland League || 17th/20 || 2nd Qualifying Round
|-
| 1921–22 || Midland League || 6th/22 || Preliminary Round
|-
| 1922–23 || Midland League || 18th/22 || 2nd Qualifying Round
|-
| 1923–24 || Midland League || 4th/22 || 2nd Qualifying Round
|-
| 1924–25 || Midland League || 8th/15 || Preliminary Round
|-
| 1925–26 || Midland League || 1st/21 || 2nd Qualifying Round
|-
| 1926–27 || Midland League || 5th/20 || 1st Round
|-
| 1927–28 || Midland League || 17th/23 || Preliminary Round
|-
| 1928–29 || Midland League || 20th/26 || 3rd Qualifying Round
|-
| 1929–30 || Midland League || 20th/26 || 3rd Qualifying Round
|-
| 1930–31 || Midland League || 20th/24 || 2nd Qualifying Round
|-
| 1931–32 || Midland League || 16th/24 || 1st Qualifying Round
|-
| 1932–33 || Midland League || 21st/23 || Preliminary Round
|-
| 1933–34 || Midland League || 16th/17 || Preliminary Round
|-
| 1934–35 || Midland League || 15th/20 || Preliminary Round
|-
| 1935–36 || Midland League || 21st/21 || 1st Qualifying Round
|}

Honours

LeagueMidland LeagueChampions: 1925–26Sheffield Association LeagueChampions: 1903–04

CupSheffield & Hallamshire Senior Cup'''
Winners: 1930–31, 1933–34
Runners-up: 1910–11, 1922–23

Records
Best FA Cup performance: 1st Round, 1927–28

References

Defunct football clubs in South Yorkshire
Sheffield Association League
Midland Football League (1889)
1903 establishments in England
1936 disestablishments in England
Association football clubs established in 1903
Association football clubs disestablished in 1936